Phalacronotus bleekeri, commonly known as Bleeker's sheatfish, is a species of catfish of the genus Phalacronotus. This species grows to a length of  SL.

This fish is found in mainland Southeast Asia.

As food
In Peninsular Malaysia, Cambodia, Laos and Thailand it is valued as food in the local cuisine for its delicate flesh. In Thailand it is one of the catfish species known in the markets as Pla Nuea On (วงศ์ปลาเนื้ออ่อน). This fish is also often used for making fish balls.

See also
List of Thai ingredients

References

External links

Phalacronotus bleekeri  (Günther, 1864) - Planet Catfish

Siluridae
Fish of Asia
Fish of Cambodia
Freshwater fish of Malaysia
Fish of Thailand
Taxa named by Albert Günther
Fish described in 1864